Experimental pathology, also known as investigative pathology, is the scientific study of disease processes through the microscopic or molecular examination of organs, tissues, cells, or body fluids from diseased organisms. It is closely related, both historically and in modern academic settings, to the medical field of pathology.

External links 
American Society for Investigative Pathology

 

Pathology
Experimental pathology is the scientific study of disease processes through the microscopic, biological, biochemical or molecular examination of organs, tissues, cells, or body fluids from diseased organisms.